Apaimanee Saga is a Thai comic series written and illustrated by Supot A. It was originally serialized in Thailand in NED Comics' magazine Boom. The story was adapted from the Thai epic poem Phra Aphai Mani by Sunthorn Phu, a legendary poet.

Apaimanee Saga is the first Thai comic that has been published in french language.

Publication History

The First series was published in weekly comics Boom in 2001 and published as trade paperback for 16 volume The Pirates Dawn a sequel and second part are published in 2007 and ran for 17 Volume The Third part call Tales Of Two Brothers published for 5 volume before Boom Magazine was cancellation in 2014 the series went on hiatus for a while until return as self published comics in 2020

Summary
The story tells the adventure of the two princes Apaimanee and Srisuwan.

Characters
 Apaimanee (อภัยมณี) The first heir of Rattana, he is the first son of Thao Srisutat and Pratumkesorn. He skilled in Pi. He was caged by the water devil and helped by the mermaid clan.
 Srisuwan (ศรีสุวรรณ) The second heir of Rattana, he is the second son of Thao Srisutat and Pratumkesorn. He skilled in Krabong which defeated Thao Utain.
 Keawkatesara (แก้วเกษรา) The princess of Romemajak, she is a lover of Srisuwan.
 
 Guardian Demon (ผีเสื้อสมุทร) The queen of the water devil, she born from the soul of 500 virgin girls.
 Sinsamoot (สินสมุทร) The son of Apaimanee and Guardian Demon, he has immense power.
 Mira (ไมร่า) The mermaid leader of dolphins who brought Apaimanee escape Guardian Demon to Ko Kaew Pitsadan. She is a daughter of Uros, the king of the mermaid clan.

See also
 Apaimanee Saga: The Pirates Dawn
 Thai comics

References

External links

Websites
 Apaimanee Sagas official webboard

Videos
 Apaimanee Saga review from YouTube

Thai comics
Fiction about mermaids
Demons in comics